Common Dreams NewsCenter, often referred to simply as Common Dreams, is a 501(c)(3) nonprofit, U.S.-based news website with a stated goal of serving the progressive community. Common Dreams publishes news stories, editorials, and a newswire of current, breaking news. Common Dreams also re-publishes relevant content from other sources such as the Associated Press and has published writers such as Robert Reich and Molly Ivins. The website also provides links to other relevant columnists, periodicals, radio outlets, news services, and websites.

History

Inspiration for the name, "Common Dreams", came from the book title, The Twilight of Common Dreams: Why America is Wracked by Culture Wars, written by Todd Gitlin and published in 1995.

The nonprofit organization, Common Dreams, was founded in 1996 by political consultant Craig Brown, and the News Center was launched the following year, in May 1997, by Brown and his wife, Lina Newhouser (1951–2008). Brown, a native of Massachusetts, has a long history in progressive politics. He was the director of the Maine Public Interest Research Group from 1973 to 1977 and worked on the presidential campaigns of former U.S. Senator Alan Cranston and U.S. Senator Paul Simon. Brown also served from 1990 to 1994 as chief of staff for Tom Andrews. Part of Brown's job was to compile news for Representative Andrews, which gave Brown the impetus to do the same on the internet.

During the Kosovo War, Common Dreams hosted the "Drumbeats of War" site which, according to the BBC, presented "a round-up of interesting articles with wide-ranging points of view that have previously appeared in newspapers and journals across the United States." Common Dreams is also known for its strong anti-war stance.

Common Dreams is funded through subscriptions and donations from its readers and does not have advertising.

Featured authors
Common Dreams has featured original articles by the following authors:

Eric Alterman
Noam Chomsky
Alexander Cockburn
Jeff Cohen
Juan Cole
Joe Conason
David Corn
Linh Dinh
Robert Fisk
Amy Goodman
Tom Hayden
Bob Herbert
Jim Hightower
Arianna Huffington
Molly Ivins
Jesse Jackson
Kathy Kelly
Naomi Klein
Paul Krugman
Michael Lerner
Michael Moore
Ralph Nader
Laura Packard
Harold Pinter
Ted Rall
Robert Reich
Frank Rich
Arundhati Roy
Bernie Sanders
Robert Scheer
Cindy Sheehan
Katrina vanden Heuvel
Howard Zinn

See also
 List of anti-war organizations

References

External links
 

Mass media in Maine
Progressivism in the United States
American political blogs
American political websites
American news websites
501(c)(3) organizations